In web design, a footer is the bottom section of a website. It is used across many websites around the internet. Footers can contain any type of HTML content, including text, images and links.

HTML5 introduced the <footer> element.

Common items that are included or linked to from footers are copyright, sitemaps, privacy policies, terms of use, contact details and directions.

References 

Web design